Justice Jenkins may refer to:

Charles J. Jenkins, associate justice of the Supreme Court of Georgia
David Jenkins, Baron Jenkins (1899–1969), British Lord Justice of Appeal
William Franklin Jenkins, associate justice of the Supreme Court of Georgia

See also
Judge Jenkins (disambiguation)